Vladimir Ilyich Kuntsevich (born 6 August 1952) is a Russian high jumper and jumping coach. Since 2012 he holds the world record in the M60 age group at 1.81 m. Previously he held a world record in the M55 category.

Kuntsev was the first coach of Ivan Ukhov, and currently coaches his daughters Yekaterina and Daria, who compete at the national level.

References

1952 births
Living people
Russian male high jumpers